Kishori Charan Das (born 1924; died 17 August 2004), also known by his short name K.C. Das, was an eminent Indian writer and translator of the Odia and English language. Known for his master interpretation of choices, disillusionment, and insecurities of the Odia middle class. His stories showcases realities of everyday life and do not delve into preaching morals or convey messages. He received the Sahitya Akademi Award in 1976 for his short story collection Thakura Ghara. He was also awarded with the Sarala Puraskar in1985 and Bishuva Puraskar in 1992.

Biography
Das was born in 1924 in Cuttack, Odisha. He worked as Additional Deputy comptroller and Auditor General of India and Director of Audit, Indian Accounts, Washington D.C., 1961-1964.  

He died on 17 August 2004.

Writing Style
Das published several collections of short stories, novels, essays, poems. He was one of the exponents of modernism in Odia literature. The characters of his fictions come from urban setting, with disrupted dreams, inner-conflict and existential anguish. Writing about the Odia society and the challenges of modern day life in post independence India where the middle class is aspirational and sometimes impatient. Although his stories begin on a simple note, they eventually reach their culmination in unexpected and surprising ways. He maintained that writing 'expresses a writer's relationship with various emotions' and 'no writing can belong to any class or community', but 'it belongs to the whole world'. He has also translated writings by other Oriya authors.

Books

Short story
 Bhanga Khelana (1961)
 Ghara Bahuda (1968)
 Laksha Vihanga (1968)
 Manihara (1970)
 Thakura Ghara (1975)
 Gaman (1980)
 Khelara nam ranga (1982)
 Bhinna Paunsha (1984)
 Death of an Indian (1984)
 Shita Lahara (1986)
 Trango Mryutu (1987)
 Nija Sanja (1992)
 The Midnight Moon and other Stories (1993)

Poetry collection
 Faces in the Dark (1980)
 Mana Kamana (1983)

Novels
 Satoti Dinara Sati (1993)
 Neta O Netramani (1997)

Honours
He was awarded the Odisha Sahitya Academy Award in 1976, Sarala Puraskar in 1985 and Bishuva Puraskar in 1992. He received the Sahitya Akademi Award in 1976 for his short story collection Thakura Ghara.

The Kishori Charan Smruti Sansad was established in his honour which gives an award named Kishori Charan Das Sahitya Purashkar to an Odia writer annually since 2007.

References

External links 
 “Sarama’s Romance” Short story by Kishori Charan Das

1924 births
2004 deaths
People from Cuttack
Recipients of the Sahitya Akademi Award in Odia
Recipients of the Odisha Sahitya Akademi Award
Writers from Odisha
Novelists from Odisha
Odia-language writers
Odia short story writers
English-language writers from India